AD 43 chars (XLIII) was a common year starting on Tuesday (link will display the full calendar) of the Julian calendar. At the time, it was known as the Year of the Consulship of Caesar and Vitellius (or, less frequently, year 796 Ab urbe condita). The denomination AD 43 for this year has been used since the early medieval period, when the Anno Domini calendar era became the prevalent method in Europe for naming years.

Events

By place

Britain 
 Roman conquest of Britain: 
 May – Aulus Plautius, crossing (probably) from Boulogne (Bononia) in the Classis Britannica, lands with four Roman legions (20,000 men) and the same number of auxiliaries at Rutupiae (probably modern Richborough) on the east coast of Kent. General (future emperor) Vespasian plays a major role in the defeat of the Britons led by the brothers Caratacus and Togodumnus (leaders of the Catuvellauni) in the 2-day Battle of the Medway (probably at the river near Rochester) and the Romans drive them back to and across the River Thames; Togodumnus dies soon after. Plautius halts at the Thames and sends for the Emperor.
 September – Emperor Claudius, who arrives with reinforcements including war elephants, leads the march on Camulodunum (modern Colchester). Eleven British kings, probably including those of the Iceni and Brigantes, submit without a fight. Plautius becomes the first Governor of Roman Britain.
 Vespasian begins to subdue the south-west.
 The Romans begin to construct forts, such as at Peterborough, and a road that later becomes Ermine Street.
 The Romans capture a Brythonic settlement at Kent and rename it Durovernum Cantiacorum (modern Canterbury); and establish a Roman fort to guard the crossing of the Kentish River Stour.
 Roman London (Londinium) is established on the Thames.

Roman Empire 
 Julia Livia, daughter of Drusus Julius Caesar, is executed at the instigation of Claudius' wife Messalina.
 Claudius annexes Lycia in Asia Minor, combining it with Pamphylia as a Roman province.
 The Romans now have complete control of the Mediterranean Sea.

Central Asia 
 Warfare begins between the northern and southern Huns.

Vietnam 
 The warrior Trung Sisters commit suicide after their resistance is defeated at Nam Viet.
 Vietnam is designated a province of China.

Parthia 
 King Vardanes I of Parthia forces the city of Seleucia on the Tigris to surrender.

By topic

Religion 
 In Coptic Orthodox Christianity, Mark the Evangelist becomes the first Pope of Alexandria, thus establishing the Christian Church in Africa.

Arts and Science 
 Pomponius Mela, Roman geographer, writes De situ orbis libri (approximate date).
</onlyinclude>

Births 
 Martial, Roman poet (approximate date)

Deaths 
 Aemilia Lepida, Roman noblewoman, fiancee of Claudius (b. 5 BC)
 Appius Junius Silanus, Roman consul (executed)
 Julia Livia, daughter of Drusus Julius Caesar (executed)
 Togodumnus, king of the Catuvellauni
 Trưng Sisters, Vietnamese military leaders (approximate date)

References 

0043

als:40er#43